Commission scolaire Marie-Victorin (CSMV) was a French-language, school board operating in the Province of Quebec, Canada and serving the municipality of Longueuil (boroughs of Le Vieux-Longueuil, Saint-Hubert and Greenfield Park), Brossard and Saint-Lambert.
The board's headquarters are in Longueuil.

CSMV was created on July 1, 1998 when school boards were reconfigured based on language. The school board serves 34,000 students and employs 4,500 people in 73 schools. The school board was named for Marie-Victorin Kirouac (1885-1944).

Elementary schools

Brossard
Charles-Bruneau
Georges-P.-Vanier
Guillaume-Vignal
Marie-Victorin
Sainte-Claire
Saint-Laurent
Samuel-De Champlain
Tourterelle

Greenfield Park
Centre hospitalier Charles-LeMoyne
École internationale de Greenfield Park
Pierre-Laporte

St-Lambert
des Saints-Anges
Préville
Rabeau

Saint-Hubert
Charles-LeMoyne
de La Mosaïque
De Maricourt
des Mille-Fleurs
des Quatre-Saisons
D'Iberville
du Jardin-Bienville
Gaétan-Boucher
Laurent-Benoît
Maurice-L.-Duplessis
Monseigneur-Forget
Paul-Chagnon
Saint-Joseph

Le Vieux-Longueuil
Adrien-Gamache
Armand-Racicot
Bel-Essor
Bourgeoys-Champagnat
Carillon
Christ-Roi
de Normandie
du Curé-Lequin
du Tournesol
École des Petits-Explorateurs
Félix-Leclerc
Gentilly
Gentilly (Boisé des lutins)
George-Étienne-Cartier
Hubert-Perron
Jacques-Ouellette
Joseph-De-Sérigny
Lajeunesse
le Déclic
Lionel-Groulx
Marie-Victorin (Longueuil) Pavillon le Jardin
Marie-Victorin (Longueuil) Pavillon l'Herbier
Paul-De Maricourt
Pierre-D'Iberville
Sainte-Claire
Saint-Jude
Saint-Romain

Secondary schools

Brossard
École secondaire Antoine-Brossard
École secondaire Pierre-Brosseau
École internationale Lucille-Teasdale

Greenfield Park
École secondaire participative l'Agora
École secondaire Saint-Edmond

Saint-Hubert
École secondaire André-Laurendeau
École secondaire Mgr-A.-M.-Parent

Le Vieux-Longueuil
École secondaire Gérard-Filion
École secondaire Jacques-Rousseau
École secondaire Saint-Jean-Baptiste

Specialized high schools
École régionale du Vent-Nouveau (Saint-Hubert)
École secondaire Hélène-De Champlain (Le Vieux-Longueuil)
Gérard-Filion (Pavillon l'Entre-Rives) (Le Vieux-Longueuil)
École Jacques-Ouellette (Le Vieux-Longueuil)

References

External links
Centre de services scolaire Marie-Victorin 

Education in Longueuil
Historical school districts in Quebec